The Hannibal Lecter franchise is an American media franchise based around the titular character, Hannibal Lecter, a brilliant, cannibalistic serial killer whose assistance is routinely sought out by law enforcement personnel to aid in the capture of other criminals. He originally appeared in a series of novels (starting with Red Dragon in 1981) by Thomas Harris. The series has since expanded into film and television, having four timeline-connected franchise films produced by MGM-Universal:  The Silence of the Lambs (1991), Hannibal (2001), Red Dragon (2002) and Hannibal Rising (2007), with three starred by Anthony Hopkins.

Novels

Red Dragon (1981)

The Silence of the Lambs (1988)

Hannibal (1999)

Hannibal Rising (2006)

Films

To date, five films have been produced, with The Silence of the Lambs reaching worldwide acclaim. Manhunter (1986) was the first film with Hannibal Lecter, serving as a standalone. The film The Silence of the Lambs (1991) is followed by a sequel, Hannibal (2001), then followed by two prequels, Red Dragon (2002) and  Hannibal Rising (2007), with all being connected films produced by Metro-Goldwyn-Mayer and Universal Pictures and starred (3/4) by actor Anthony Hopkins. The film Red Dragon (2002) is based on the first film, Manhunter (1986).

Manhunter  (1986) 

The first adaptation was the 1986 film Manhunter, which was an adaptation of Red Dragon, directed by Michael Mann.

The Silence of the Lambs  (1991) 

The next adaptation was 1991's The Silence of the Lambs, which was directed by Jonathan Demme and was the first film to feature Anthony Hopkins in the role of Hannibal Lecter. Silence was a success, both critically and financially, and went on to become the third film in Academy Awards history to win in all top five categories (Best Actor for Hopkins, Best Actress for Jodie Foster, Best Director for Demme, Best Adapted Screenplay for Ted Tally, and Best Picture).

Hannibal  (2001) 

Hopkins reprised the role in 2001's Hannibal, a sequel directed by Ridley Scott.

Red Dragon (2002) 

Hopkins once again reprised the role in Red Dragon, a prequel directed by Brett Ratner. In 2002, Hopkins revealed that he had written a screenplay for another sequel, ending with Clarice Starling killing Lecter, but it was not produced.

Hannibal Rising (2007) 

In 2007, Hannibal Rising was released. The film is a prequel, directed by Peter Webber and starring Gaspard Ulliel as Lecter.

Television

Hannibal  (2013–2015) 

In 2013, the TV series Hannibal premiered. Developed by Bryan Fuller, it is not a direct adaptation, but based on characters and elements from the novels. Some male characters have become female, such as Freddy Lounds, who is renamed Fredricka "Freddie" Lounds. The series has garnered much critical acclaim since its premiere, winning the 2014 and 2015 Saturn Awards for Best Network Television Series, as well as the inaugural Best Action-Thriller Television Series award in 2016.

Clarice (2021) 

In May 2012, Lifetime announced to develop a television series centered on Starling after her graduation from the FBI academy, which was to be produced by MGM; the project was never picked up and was shelved. CBS later developed the series of the same name, with Alex Kurtzman and Jenny Lumet as producers, as a sequel to The Silence of the Lambs set in 1993, starring Rebecca Breeds as Starling. The show premiered in 2021.

Cast and characters

Reception

Box office performance
The Hannibal Lecter films, when compared to other top-grossing American horror franchises—Alien vs. Predator, Candyman, Child's Play, The Conjuring, The Exorcist, Evil Dead, Final Destination, Friday the 13th, Halloween, Hellraiser, I Know What You Did Last Summer, Jaws, A Nightmare on Elm Street, The Omen, Paranormal Activity, Psycho, The Purge, Saw, Scream, and The Texas Chainsaw Massacre—is one of the highest grossing horror film franchises.

Critical reception

Musical 
In 2005, comedian-musicians Jon and Al Kaplan, most famous for their musical re-imaginings of popular films as YouTube musicals, parodied The Silence of the Lambs, especially the film version, in Silence! The Musical. It premiered Off-Off-Broadway and has since had acclaimed productions in London (2009) and Los Angeles (2012). In 2012, it won the Los Angeles Drama Critics Circle – Score, Lead Performance, Choreography Award.

In 2016, rock band Conan Neutron & the Secret Friends released their second record, The Art of Murder, a concept album which was "directly inspired by the Hannibal Lecter series of books by Thomas Harris".

References

 
Mass media franchises introduced in 1981
Thriller novel series
Horror mass media franchises